The 2022–23 Stephen F. Austin Lumberjacks basketball team represented Stephen F. Austin State University in the 2022–23 NCAA Division I men's basketball season. The Lumberjacks, led by seventh-year head coach Kyle Keller, played their home games at the William R. Johnson Coliseum in Nacogdoches, Texas as members of the Western Athletic Conference.

Previous season
The Lumberjacks finished the 2021–22 season 22–10, 14–4 in WAC play to finish as WAC regular season co-champions, alongside New Mexico State and Seattle. As the No. 3 seed in the WAC tournament, they were upset by No. 6 seed Abilene Christian in the third round. They were invited to the CBI, where they lost to 2021–22 UNC Asheville Bulldogs men's basketball team in the first round.

Roster

Schedule and results

|-
!colspan=12 style=""| Non-conference regular season

|-
!colspan=12 style=""|WAC regular season

|-
!colspan=9 style=| WAC tournament

Sources

References

Stephen F. Austin
Stephen F. Austin Lumberjacks basketball seasons
Stephen F. Austin Lumberjacks basketball
Stephen F. Austin Lumberjacks basketball